The Hunter 26.5 is an American sailboat that was designed by the Hunter Design Team and first built in 1985.

Production
The design was built by Hunter Marine in the United States between 1985 and 1987, but it is now out of production.

Design

The Hunter 26.5 is a recreational keelboat, built predominantly of fiberglass. It has a fractional sloop rig, an aluminum mast and boom, a raked stem, a walk-through reverse transom, an internally-mounted spade-type rudder controlled by a laminated wooden tiller and a fixed wing keel. It displaces  and carries  of ballast.

The boat is normally fitted with a small outboard motor for docking and maneuvering. A  outboard was factory standard equipment.

The boat was delivered with many items as standard equipment, as part of the manufacturer's Cruise Pac. These included a 110% genoa foresail, mast head wind indicator, stainless steel front and rear pulpits, lifelines and stanchions, a stainless steel re-boarding ladder, holly and teak wood interior, dinette table, portable toilet, a stainless steel galley sink, stove, ice chest, an outboard motor bracket, anchor and anchor line and even life jackets.

The design has a PHRF racing average handicap of 189 with a high of 198 and low of 186.

See also
List of sailing boat types

Similar sailboats
Beneteau First 26
Beneteau First 265
C&C 26
C&C 26 Wave
Contessa 26
Dawson 26
Discovery 7.9
Grampian 26
Herreshoff H-26
Hunter 26
Hunter 260
Hunter 270
MacGregor 26
Mirage 26
Nash 26
Nonsuch 26
Paceship PY 26
Parker Dawson 26
Pearson 26
Sandstream 26
Tanzer 26
Yamaha 26

References

External links

Original official brochure
Hunter 26.5 exterior and interior photos

Keelboats
1980s sailboat type designs
Sailing yachts
Sailboat type designs by Hunter Design Team
Sailboat types built by Hunter Marine